Peter Beer may also refer to:
Peter Beer (judge) (1928–2018), American judge
Peter Beer (RAF officer) (born 1941), British Air Vice Marshal